Tom Morris may refer to:

Old Tom Morris (1821–1908), early golf champion
Young Tom Morris (1851–1875), son of the above, also a golf champion
Tom Morris (footballer, born 1884) (1884–1918), English footballer
Tom Morris (footballer, died 1942), footballer who played for Tottenham Hotspur F.C. in the 1890s and 1900s
Tom Morris (cyclist) (born 1944), Canadian Olympic cyclist
Tom Morris (businessman) (born 1954), British billionaire businessman, founder of Home Bargains
Tom Morris (director) (born 1964), British theatre director, producer, and writer
Tom Morris Jr., television personality

See also
 Thomas Morris (disambiguation)